A Place Where We Could Go is the first album by Jeremy Jay, released by K Records. It was produced by K founder and former Beat Happening frontman Calvin Johnson. It was well received by Pitchfork. In his review, Marc Hogan compared him to David Bowie. Hogan also mentioned that Jay's spoken-sung vocals, recalled the solo work of Jonathan Richman, with a certain punk sensibility.

The album was released on vinyl and CD.

Track listing 
All tracks by Jeremy Jay

 "Nite Nite" – 0:06
 "Heavenly Creatures" – 4:10
 "Beautiful Rebel" – 2:33
 "The Living Dolls" – 2:54
 "Escape to Aspen" – 2:19
 "Till We Meet Again" – 2:40
 "A Place Where We Could Go" – 2:43
 "While the City Sleeps" – 3:08
 "Hold Me in Your Arms Tonite" – 2:43
 "Someone Cares" – 2:42

Personnel 
Larissa James – photography
Jeremy Jay – guitar, piano, vocals, producer
Calvin Johnson – producer, engineer, mixing
Chris Sutton – drums
Nick Zwart – assistant engineer

References

2008 albums
Jeremy Jay albums
K Records albums